Mario is a 1984 Quebec drama film, set in the Magdalen Islands, directed by Jean Beaudin and produced by the National Film Board of Canada.

Plot
Mario (Petermann) is a 10-year-old autistic boy who is mute and hard of hearing. He has an 18-year-old brother whom he admires greatly. One day, Simon (Reddy) becomes involved with a woman and, as a result, their relationship becomes strained. Mario finds himself without his brother and his parents who are always watching over their island during the tourist season.

Production
The film, based on Claude Jasmin's La Sablière, went overbudget.

Recognition
 1985 Genie Award for Best Achievement in Cinematography - Won (Pierre Mignot)
 1985 Genie Award for Best Achievement in Overall Sound - Won (Bruce Nyznik, Richard Besse, Hans Peter Strobl)
 1985 Genie Award for Best Achievement in Music - Original Score - Won (François Dompierre)
 1985 Genie Award for Best Achievement in Art Direction/Production Design - Nominated (Denis Boucher)
 1985 Genie Award for Best Achievement in Sound Editing - Nominated (David Evans, Wayne Griffin)
 1985 Genie Award for Best Motion Picture - Nominated (Jean Beaudin, Hélène Verrier)
 1985 Genie Award for Best Performance by an Actor in a Leading Role - Nominated (Xavier Norman Petermann)

See also
 List of fictional characters on the autistic spectrum

References

Works cited

External links
 
 

1984 films
1984 drama films
1980s French-language films
Films directed by Jean Beaudin
Films set in Quebec
National Film Board of Canada films
Magdalen Islands
Films about autism
Films produced by Jacques Bobet
Films scored by François Dompierre
Canadian drama films
French-language Canadian films
1980s Canadian films